Trương Huỳnh Phú (born 25 August 1988) is a Vietnamese footballer who plays as a defender for V.League 2 club Bình Phước.

Club career

Return to Becamex Binh Duong
Huỳnh Phú signed a 2-year deal with his former club Becamex Binh Duong in November 2015.

References 

1988 births
Living people
Vietnamese footballers
Association football defenders
V.League 1 players
Becamex Binh Duong FC players
Dong Nai FC players
People from Quảng Ngãi province